The flag of Novgorod Oblast was adopted on 24 December 2007.

Flag of the Novgorod region is rectangular with a ratio of 2:3, which consists of three vertical stripes, being similar to the flag of France and the Provincial Flag of Bohol, Philippines, correlated with each other as 1: 2: 1, blue (hoist), white (middle), and red. In the center of the white band is a shield similar to that found in the coat of arms of the oblast. The shield ratio is equal to 1/4 full length.

References
Flags of the World

Flags of Russia
Flag
Flags displaying animals